The City of Tea Tree Gully is a local council in the Australian state of South Australia, in the outer north-eastern suburbs of Adelaide. The major business district in the city is at Modbury, where Westfield Tea Tree Plaza, the Civic Centre and the library are located.

Howard, Lord Florey, Australian pathologist and co-discoverer of penicillin, was a resident of the City of Tea Tree Gully.

Suburbs and post codes 

 Banksia Park – 5091
 Dernancourt – 5075
 Fairview Park – 5126
 Gilles Plains – 5086
 Golden Grove – 5125
 Gould Creek – 5114
 Greenwith – 5125
 Gulfview Heights – 5096
 Highbury – 5089
 Holden Hill – 5088
 Hope Valley – 5090
 Houghton – 5131
 Modbury – 5092
 Modbury Heights – 5092
 Modbury North – 5092
 Para Hills – 5096
 Redwood Park – 5097
 Ridgehaven – 5097
 St Agnes – 5097
 Salisbury East – 5109
 Surrey Downs – 5126
 Tea Tree Gully – 5091
 Upper Hermitage – 5131
 Valley View – 5093
 Vista – 5091
 Wynn Vale – 5127
 Yatala Vale – 5126

Council
The current council (as of March 2023):

History 

The Tea Tree gully itself passes through the Adelaide foothills roughly marking the easiest path eastwards from Grand Junction Road to Gumeracha. The 1850s settlement at the entrance to the gully (approximately where North East Road enters the foothills) was known as the village of 'Steventon' after a local resident, John Stevens, who was a major landowner in the area. The name Steventon is retained as one of the electoral wards of the City of Tea Tree Gully.

The council was originally proclaimed in October 1858 as the District Council of Tea Tree Gully, when the northern half of the District Council of Highercombe, which had been created in 1853, successfully seceded to form its own municipality. In the early 1930s, the two councils were considered unviable, being very small in relative size and population. The District Council of Highercombe was included in a Local Government Commission list of 53 local councils with annual revenue of less than £2000. Following the commission recommendation, the two councils were recombined under the name Tea Tree Gully in May 1935.

It inherited the former 1855 Highercombe council chambers, which had been built in Tea Tree Gully, and used that building until 1967. The Old Tea Tree Gully Council Chambers survive today and are listed on the South Australian Heritage Register, having been the first purpose-built district council chambers in South Australia. In 1967 the Tea Tree Gully civic centre was opened, comprising a new council chamber and civic hall. The municipality was granted city status and proclaimed as the City of Tree Gully in 1968.

A council-owned colonial building was converted into a community art gallery, and is now known as Gallery 1855. The gallery hosts regular contemporary art and craft exhibitions and artist-led workshops.

From 1954 to 1971 the population of Tea Tree Gully council rose from just over 2,500 to almost 37,000, and in 1975 it had reached approximately 55,000 as urban residential development quickly expanded. By 2004 the population had exceeded 100,000.

Chairmen and mayors of Tea Tree Gully

 William Henry Ind (1936–1943) 
 Albert George Dearman (1943-1951) 
 George Norman Lambert (1951-1954) 
 Albert George Dearman (1954-1955) 
 David Stanley Goodes (1955-1957) 
 Basil David Mitchell (1957–1960) 
 Viggo Ole Jacobsen (1960–1965) 
 William Green (1967–1969) 
 William Gilbert Brassington (1969–1972) 
 John Charles Burford (1972–1974) 
 John Garfield Tilley (1974–1981) 
 Donald David Stuart (1981–1982) 
 John Garfield Tilley (1982–1989) 
 Thomas Edward Loveland Milton (1989-1991)
 Lesley Purdom (1991-1997)
 Bernie Keane (1997-2000)
 Lesley Purdom (2000-2006)
 Miriam Smith (2006-2014)
 Pat Trainor (2014)
 Kevin Knight (2014-2022)
 Marijka Ryan (2022-Current)

Geography 

The gully to which the city name refers actually exists and is known to be sizable as it provided a gradient negotiable only by bullock wagons travelling through the Mt. Lofty Ranges. Additionally the gully had permanent freshwater springs which promoted the growth of tea trees in the area – thus the eventual name 'Tea Tree Gully'.

The  Anstey Hill Recreation Park is adjacent to the suburbs of Vista and Tea Tree Gully.

Sister cities 
The City of Tea Tree Gully, has one sister city. it is the:
  Asakuchi, Japan (April 2006)

See also

 List of Adelaide parks and gardens

Notes and references
Notes

Reference

External links 

City of Tea Tree Gully Library
Gallery 1855
City of Tea Tree Gully community profile (I.D. Consulting Pty Ltd)
Council boundaries at June 2004 (City of Tea Tree Gully)

Local government areas of South Australia
Local government areas in Adelaide